James Mark "Jerry" Bryant (1826 – 10 December 1881) was an Australian cricketer. He played first-class cricket matches for Surrey and Victoria. He was born in England in 1826, being christened on 24 October of that year at Caterham, Surrey.

Bryant was an instrumental figure at the outset of Australian rules football, providing footballs, equipment and amenities for many of the earliest recorded matches in the parklands of Melbourne. His hotel, the Parade Hotel, near the Melbourne Cricket Ground, is where the first laws of the game were codified by members of the Melbourne Football Club in May 1859.

References

1826 births
Date of birth missing
1881 deaths
Australian cricketers
Surrey cricketers
Victoria cricketers
Place of birth missing
English players of Australian rules football
Melbourne Football Club founders
Melbourne Cricket Club cricketers
Melbourne Football Club (pre-VFA) players